Events from the year 1890 in Sweden

Incumbents
 Monarch – Oscar II
 Prime Minister – Gustaf Åkerhielm.

Events
 - The mining company Luossavaara-Kiirunavaara Aktiebolag (LKAB) founded. 
 - The newspaper Upsala Nya Tidning founded.
 - KFUM Örebro
 - LKAB
 - Nordstjernan
 - Uddevalla Suffrage Association
 - Lilly Engström became the first female member of a Board of education.
 7 August - Anna Månsdotter became the last woman in Sweden to be executed.

Births
7 March – Gustaf Weidel, gymnast (died 1959).
 27 April – Karl Asplund, poet, short story writer and art historian (died 1978).
 28 August – Gustaf Dyrsch, horse rider (died 1974).
 26 September – Karl Lindahl, gymnast (died 1960).
 2 November – Moa Martinson, author (died 1964).

Deaths
 

 8 March -  Josefina Deland, women's rights activist (born 1814)
20 September – Gustaf Wilhelm Palm, landscape painter and art professor (born 1810).
7 October – Edvard Perséus, painter (born 1841).
 11 November - Emilie Risberg, writer and reform pedagogue (born 1815)

Full date missing 
 Herman Schultz, astronomer (born 1823).

References

External links

 
Years of the 19th century in Sweden